Gloucester station is a railway station in Gloucester, England.

Gloucester station may also refer to:

Gloucester station (MBTA), in Gloucester, Massachusetts, United States
Gloucester railway station, New South Wales, Australia

See also
Gloucester (disambiguation)